Ulster is one of the four provinces of Ireland. Due to large-scale plantations of people from Scotland and England during the 17th and 18th centuries, as well as decades of conflict in the 20th, Ulster has a unique culture, quite different from the rest of Ireland. As all of Northern Ireland lies within Ulster and comprises about 90% of its population, the culture of Northern Ireland is very similar to that of the whole of Ulster. In particular, the Ulster Scots, or Scots Irish identity is strong among descendents of the Plantation, notably in counties Antrim, Cavan, Donegal, and Down. There is also a thriving indigenous Gaelic culture, largely attributed to the GAA and Conradh na Gaeilge.

Languages
Ulster English is the English-based dialect of most people in Ulster, including those in the two main cities. It represents a cross-over area between Ulster Scots and Hiberno-English. The dialect is currently encroaching on the Ulster Scots area, especially in the Belfast commuter belt, and may eventually consume it. Ulster Scots, also known as Ullans, Hiberno-Scots, or Scots-Irish, refers to the variety of Scots spoken in parts of Ulster.

Ulster Irish is the dialect of the Irish language spoken in Ulster. The only county in Ulster to include Gaeltacht regions today is County Donegal, so that the term Donegal Irish is often used synonymously. Because of historical connections with Ulster, the southern dialects of Scottish Gaelic and Manx share similarities with Ulster Irish.

Polish and Lithuanian are the most common foreign languages in Ulster.

Sport
Ulster Rugby represents the province in the European Rugby Champions.

Food and drink

A dish from Ulster is the  Ulster fry, usually served at breakfast. Also across Ulster dishes are found containing seafood, especially salmon and trout from County Donegal and County Down.

A popular soft drink in Derry, parts of County Londonderry and  parts of County Tyrone, as well as across County Donegal, is McDaid's Football Special, which is made in Ramelton.

A famous ice cream made in Ulster is Morelli's, which is made near Portrush. Mullin's Icecream, made near Kilrea in the east of County Londonderry, is another famous Ulster icecream. In the south east of the province, Newry boasts 'Timoney's' ice cream on Canal Street, Warrenpoint has the famed 'Genoa' and Rathfriland on the hill is fortunate to host Graham's.

A well-known sweet made in Ulster is Yellow Man, while a famous confectionery company is Oatfield Sweets Ltd., who were previously based in Letterkenny in County Donegal. Oatfield, who were founded in 1927, were particularly famous for producing the Emerald sweet.

Music

Song
Ulster Irish or Donegal Irish is exclusive to Ulster. Ulster Irish is very different, as is the old style of prose and songwriting. Whereas in other parts of Ireland songs tend to be structured, in Ulster songs are wider ranging in style. Counties Donegal and Antrim are well known for songs of speed, much like Donegal fiddle playing. It is unique in the sean-nós traditional in both tempo and in wording and is often more free in structure and ornamentation.

Notable Ulster singers and songwriters by historical area*:
 Mairéad Ní Mhaonaigh – Gaoth Dobhair, County Donegal
 Moya Brennan – Gaoth Dobhair, County Donegal
 Sarah Makem – Keady, County Armagh

* Historical area refers to the period of the traditional music the artist is known best for singing.

Fiddle
Ulster fiddle playing is distinct from the rest of Ireland in that it has been greatly influenced from neighbouring Scotland, in particular the Hebrides.

See also
 Irish traditional music
 Irish language
 Ulster-Scots
 Scotch-Irish Americans
 Scotch-Irish Canadians

References

External links
 BBC Nations History of Ireland
 The British Isles Independent view of Ireland and the UK
  Inconvenient Peripheries Ethnic Identity and the United Kingdom Estate The cases of "Protestant Ulster" and Cornwall’ by prof Philip Payton
 Mercator Atlas of Europe Map of Ireland ("Irlandia") circa 1564

Irish culture
 
Ulster